Kane Falconer (born 7 June 1997) is a rugby union player for Canon Eagles a professional Japanese rugby union team competing in the Top League.

References

1997 births
New Zealand rugby union players
Yokohama Canon Eagles players
People educated at Christchurch Boys' High School
Living people
Rugby union flankers
Rugby union players from Perth, Western Australia